Sébastien Ricard (born May 25, 1972) is a Canadian musician and actor from Quebec most noted as a member of the hip hop band Loco Locass. As an actor, he won the Prix Jutra for Best Actor at the 12th Jutra Awards in 2010 for his performance as Dédé Fortin in Through the Mist (Dédé, à travers les brumes), and was nominated for Best Supporting Actor at the 15th Jutra Awards in 2013 for his performance as Ji-Guy in Before My Heart Falls (Avant que mon cœur bascule). His other film roles have included Raphaël in Gabrielle, Christophe Ducharme in Chorus, Léopold Lacroix in Hochelaga, Land of Souls (Hochelaga, terre des âmes), Christophe in The Acrobat (L'Acrobate), Brother Jean in The Vinland Club (Le Club Vinland), and Samuel Chapdelaine in Maria Chapdelaine.

References

External links

1972 births
21st-century Canadian male actors
21st-century Canadian rappers
Canadian male film actors
Canadian male television actors
Canadian male rappers
Musicians from Quebec
Male actors from Quebec
Living people
21st-century Canadian male musicians
Best Actor Jutra and Iris Award winners